Rose Gwynneth Cobden Holt (1909–1995), was a British artist known for her ivory sculptures on religious subjects. Her most famous work is a depiction of the  Annunciation, created circa 1946.

Biography

Holt was born in Wednesbury, Staffordshire in 1909. She was the eldest of three daughters and after attending St Anne's Convent in Birmingham, was accepted into Wolverhampton School of Art aged 16. There she studied under Richard Emerson and met a fellow student, T. B. Huxley-Jones, whom she married in 1934. They were both awarded places at the Royal College of Art but Holt did not take her place due to the financial burden on her family.

Huxley-Jones studied under Richard Garbe, an eminent sculptor in ivory and tortoiseshell, materials not commonly used by sculptors at the time. He would influence the direction of both their work. In 1934, Huxley-Jones was appointed Head of Sculpture at Gray's School of Art in Aberdeen, where the couple were based for twelve years. It was during this time that Holt created Annunciation.

Holt went on to produce numerous ecclesiastical commissions and exhibited widely, including at the Royal Society of British Sculptors, the Society of Portrait Sculptors, the Royal Academy, the Royal Scottish Academy and the Royal Glasgow Institute of the Fine Arts. She was also among the first female members of the Royal Society of Sculptors. However, she expressed with frustration, her feelings on the male-dominated nature of the profession."Women are just as intelligent as men, and their contribution to art is just as valuable: They are not given a chance to take art up seriously. What with looking after the house, there is not much time left for concentrating on art."

Works held in public collections

Works held in private collections

References

External links 

1909 births
1995 deaths
20th-century British sculptors
20th-century English women artists
Alumni of the University of Wolverhampton
English women sculptors
People from Wednesbury